Wilson Edmund Marsh (14 December 1927 – 18 April 2010) was a Scottish footballer who played as a goalkeeper in the Football League.

Marsh was born in Scotland, however he grew up in South London. He signed for Charlton Athletic from Erith & Belvedere in 1950 as a back-up for the Addicks first choice goalkeeper at the time Sam Bartram. He found first team opportunities limited at The Valley and moved on to Luton Town in 1956, and later on to Torquay United in 1959. In the 1959–60 season he was part of Torquay's first ever promotion squad making 20 appearances under Eric Webber, as United were promoted to the Third Division. Over the next three seasons he competed with Mervyn Gill for the number one spot at Plainmoor, making 64 league and cup appearances. After a short spell at Bideford he retired from the game to become a representative for a paint company.

References

External links

1927 births
2010 deaths
Scottish footballers
Footballers from Dundee
Association football goalkeepers
Erith & Belvedere F.C. players
Charlton Athletic F.C. players
Luton Town F.C. players
Torquay United F.C. players
English Football League players
Bideford A.F.C. players
Anglo-Scots